Bent Sørensen may refer to:

 Bent Sørensen (composer) (born 1958), Danish composer
 Bent Sørensen (footballer) (1926–2011), Danish footballer
 Bent Sørensen (physicist) (born 1941), Danish physicist